Tommy Haas was the defending champion but was knocked out by top seed Roger Federer in the semifinals.
Federer won 6–7, 6–3, 6–4 against Mikhail Youzhny to claim a record sixth title and his first since 2008.

Seeds
The top four seeds received a bye into the second round.

Draw

Finals

Top half

Bottom half

Qualifying

Seeds
The top three seeds received byes into the second round.

Qualifiers

Lucky losers
  Mirza Bašić

Qualifying draw

First qualifier

Second qualifier

Third qualifier

Fourth qualifier

External links
 Main draw
 Qualifying draw

2013 Gerry Weber Open